Australia's diverse and often attractive flora has been depicted on numerous Australian stamp issues:

Acacia baileyana – 1978
Acacia coriacea – 2002
Acacia dealbata (?) – 1982
Acacia melanoxylon – 1996
Acacia pycnantha – 1959, 1979, 1990
Acmena smithii – 2002
Actinodium cunninghamii – 2005
Actinotus helianthi – 1959
Adansonia gregorii – 2005 
Anigozanthos 'Bush Tango' – 2003
Anigozanthos manglesii – 1962, 1968, 2006
Armillaria luteobubalina fungus – 1981
Banksia integrifolia – 2000
Banksia prionotes (?) –  1996
Banksia serrata – 1960, 1986
Barringtonia calyptrata – 2001
Blandfordia grandiflora – 1960, 1967
Blandfordia punicea – 2007
Brachychiton acerifolius – 1978
Callistemon glaucus – 2000
Callistemon teretifolius – 1975
Caleana major – 1986
Caltha introloba – 1986
Calytrix carinata – 2002
Celmisia asteliifolia – 1986
Cochlospermum gillivraei – 2001
Coprinus comatus fungus – 1981
Correa reflexa – 1986, 1999
Cortinarius austrovenetus fungus – 1981
Cortinarius cinnabarinus fungus – 1981
Dendrobium nindii – 1986, 2003
Dendrobium phalaenopsis – 1968, 1998
Dicksonia antarctica – 1996
Dillenia alata – 1986
Diuris magnifica – 2006
Elythranthera emarginata – 1986
Epacris impressa – 1968
Eucalyptus caesia – 1982
Eucalyptus calophylla 'Rosea' – 1982
Eucalyptus camaldulensis – 1974
Eucalyptus diversicolor – 2005
Eucalyptus ficifolia – 1982
Eucalyptus forrestiana – 1982
Eucalyptus globulus – 1968, 1982
Eucalyptus grossa – 2005
Eucalyptus pauciflora – 2005
Euschemon rafflesia – 1983
Eucalyptus papuana – 1978, 1993, 2002
Eucalyptus regnans – 1996
Eucalyptus sp. – 1985
Ficus macrophylla – 2005
Gossypium sturtianum – 1971, 1978, 2007
Grevillea juncifolia – 2002
Grevillea mucronulata – 2007
Grevillea 'Superb' – 2003
Hakea laurina – 2006
Hardenbergia violacea – 2000
Helichrysum thomsonii – 1975
Helipterum albicans – 1986
Hibbertia scandens – 1999
Hibiscus meraukensis – 1986
Ipomoea pes-caprae ssp. brasiliensis – 1999 
Leucochrysum albicans – 1986
Microseros lanceolata – 2002
Nelumbo nucifera – 2002
Nymphaea immutabilis – 2002
Phalaenopsis rosenstromii – 1998
Phebalium whitei – 2007
Swainsona formosa – 1968, 1971, 2005
Santalum acuminatum – 2002
Telopea speciosissima – 1959, 1968, 2006
Thelymitra variegata – 1986
Thysanothus tuberosus – 2005
Wahlenbergia gloriosa – 1986
Wahlenbergia stricta – 1999
Wollemia nobilis – 2005 
Xanthorrhoea australis – 1978

See also
List of people on stamps of Australia
List of butterflies on stamps of Australia

References
Australian Plants on Postage Stamps by Australian National Botanic Gardens
Australian Stamp Bulletin No. 280 June - August 2005
Australian Stamp Bulletin No. 282 January - February 2006
Australian Stamp Bulletin No. 286 January - March 2007

Australia
Australian culture
Stamps
Postage stamps of Australia
Australia philately-related lists